The 1963 Texas Tech Red Raiders football team represented Texas Technological College—now known as Texas Tech University—as a member of the Southwest Conference (SWC) during the 1963 NCAA University Division football season. In their third season under head coach J. T. King, the Red Raiders compiled a 5–5 record (2–5 against conference opponents), tied for sixth place in the SWC, and were outscored by opponents by a combined total of 178 to 147. The team's statistical leaders included James Ellis with 536 passing yards, Donny Anderson with 609 rushing yards, and David Parks with 499 receiving yards. The team played its home games at Clifford B. and Audrey Jones Stadium.

Schedule

References

Texas Tech
Texas Tech Red Raiders football seasons
Texas Tech Red Raiders football